Antoine-François Callet (1741–1823), generally known as Antoine Callet, was a French painter of portraits and allegorical works, who acted as official portraitist to Louis XVI.

He won the grand prix de Rome in 1764 with Cléobis et Biton conduisent le char de leur mère au temple de Junon (Kleobis and Biton dragging their mother's cart to the temple of Juno). He was accepted by the Académie des beaux arts in 1779, with his entry piece being a portrait of the comte d'Artois, and received with his allegory Le printemps (Spring) in 1781. He exhibited at the Salon from 1783 onwards.

He painted the centre of the ceiling of the grande galerie of the palais du Luxembourg, with a composition entitled L'Aurore (Aurora). Under the French Consulate and the First French Empire he painted several more allegories, including an Allégorie du dix-huit brumaire ou la France sauvée (Allegory of 18 Brumaire, or France saved - 1801, château de Versailles) and an Allégorie de la bataille d'Austerlitz (Allegory of the Battle of Austerlitz - 1806, château de Versailles).

Callet died in 1823 in Paris.

References
 Marc Sandoz, Antoine-François Callet, 1741-1823, Ed. Éditart - Quatre Chemins, Tours, 1985.

External links

 La Tribune de l'Art, on a document by Antoine Callet at auction, later bought by the Parisian gallery Didier Aaron.

1741 births
1823 deaths
18th-century French painters
French male painters
19th-century French painters
19th-century French male artists
18th-century French male artists